The Illinois Zephyr and Carl Sandburg are a pair of passenger trains operated by Amtrak on a  route between Chicago and Quincy, Illinois. As Illinois Service trains, they are partially funded by the Illinois Department of Transportation. Between Chicago and Galesburg, Illinois, the trains share their route with the California Zephyr and Southwest Chief; the remainder of the route (Galesburg–Quincy) is served exclusively by the Illinois Zephyr/Carl Sandburg.

The Illinois Zephyr is the longest continuously operated state-sponsored train, having started in November 1971. The Carl Sandburg was added as the route's second daily round trip in 2006.

During fiscal year 2021, the Illinois Zephyr and Carl Sandburg carried a combined 78,200 passengers, a 22% decrease over fiscal year 2020. The two trains had a total revenue of $10.5 million in fiscal year 2021, a 9.5% decrease over fiscal year 2014.

Due to crew shortages, the morning trains are currently being substituted with buses until January 17, 2023.

History

The initial train route between Quincy and Chicago first opened as a part of three independent railroads in 1855.  The portion of track between Quincy and Galesburg was owned by the Northern Cross Railroad, led by Nehemiah Bushnell, and was completed in 1854.  This connected with the Central Military Tract Road between Galesburg and Mendota, Illinois.  At Mendota, it connected with the Chicago and Aurora Railroad to complete the route to Chicago.  These three railroads eventually merged into the Chicago, Burlington and Quincy Railroad.

The Illinois Zephyr is a descendant of the Kansas City Zephyr and American Royal Zephyr passenger train routes operated by the Chicago, Burlington and Quincy Railroad from 1953 until 1968 and 1971, respectively. The state of Illinois intervened in 1971 at the request of Quincy College (now Quincy University), Western Illinois University, and residents of western Illinois. This became part of the "Illinois Service" initiative in 1971 and is partially funded by the Illinois Department of Transportation. Service on the Illinois Zephyr began on November 14, 1971, between Chicago and West Quincy, Missouri. The name "Zephyr" is preserved in the current name of the line.  Today the Illinois Zephyr enjoys strong support from the communities it passes through, and is one of the most successful Amtrak routes.

Service to Plano began on April 30, 1972. Service to Quincy proper began on April 24, 1983 in response to the West Quincy station being frequently cut off by flooding. The suburban stop at Aurora, was discontinued on April 28, 1985, in favor of Naperville. Passenger service was cut back to Quincy on May 1, 1994, after a major flood in 1993 destroyed the original station at West Quincy. The Illinois Zephyr and the Carl Sandburg trainsets continue to cross the Mississippi River to layover at the BNSF West Quincy railyard for servicing between runs.

On October 30, 2006, a second round trip, the Carl Sandburg was added as part of the Midwest Regional Rail Initiative. The train's name honors the famed and Pulitzer-winning writer Carl Sandburg, whose birthplace in Galesburg, Illinois lies just a few hundred feet from this train's route. The morning westbound/evening eastbound schedule complements the opposite morning eastbound/evening westbound schedule of the Illinois Zephyr.

Starting November 16, 2022, Amtrak began substituting the morning runs of the Illinois Zephyr (train 380) and Carl Sandburg (train 381) with Amtrak Thruway buses due to staffing shortages at Amtrak's Quincy crew base. The suspension is expected to last until January 17, 2023.

Proposed extension

During 2010, Amtrak contacted officials from communities in northeastern Missouri and western Illinois regarding the feasibility of extending the routes from Quincy to the Missouri cities of Hannibal and St. Louis. Without any funding, though, no formal planning or studies were done for the extension.

Plans for a Hannibal extension were revived in late 2021, when a coalition of political, business, and transportation leaders was formed. A committee will investigate potential station locations in downtown Hannibal (including the Y Men’s Pavilion), discuss surrounding mobility issues (including parking, walkability, and flooding), and work to find funding for planning and studies. The committee, which will be soliciting input from the public, held its first meeting January 2022.

Stops

Ridership

Rolling stock

A normal Amtrak Illinois Zephyr or Carl Sandburg consists of:
One Siemens SC-44 Charger locomotive
Two to five Amfleet I or Horizon Fleet coaches
One Amfleet I or Horizon fleet Cafe/Business class car
Sometimes one non-powered cab car, otherwise known as an NPCU, rebuilt from an EMD F40PH

References

Notes

External links

Amtrak routes
Passenger rail transportation in Illinois
Railway services introduced in 1971
Railway services introduced in 2006
1971 establishments in Illinois